Tomas Quinlan (born 27 January 1995) is an Irish professional rugby union player. He previously played as a fly-half for the Colorado Raptors in Major League Rugby (MLR).

He previously played for RC Narbonne in the Pro D2 league and for Ireland U20s internationally.

References

1995 births
Living people
Expatriate rugby union players in the United States
American Raptors players
Irish expatriate rugby union players
Irish expatriate sportspeople in the United States
RC Narbonne players
Rugby union fly-halves
Sportspeople from Cork (city)
Irish rugby union players